Fairfield Siding railway station co-served the village of Kippen, Stirling, Scotland, from 1861 to 1866 on the Forth and Clyde Junction Railway.

History 
The station was opened in June 1861 by the Forth and Clyde Junction Railway.it was only used on Fridays. It was also a farm siding, the farm being to the north. There was also a cottage on the south side of the line. The station closed in October 1866.

References 

Disused railway stations in Stirlingshire
Railway stations in Great Britain opened in 1861
Railway stations in Great Britain closed in 1866
1861 establishments in Scotland
1866 disestablishments in Scotland